This article is about the demographic features of the population of Slovenia, including population density, ethnicity, education level, health of the populace, economic status, religious affiliations and other aspects of the population.

With 101 inhabitants per square kilometre (262/sq mi), Slovenia ranks low among the European countries in population density (compared to 402/km2 (1042/sq mi) for the Netherlands or 195/km2 (505/sq mi) for Italy). The Littoral–Inner Carniola Statistical Region has the lowest population density while the Central Slovenia Statistical Region has the highest.

According to the 2002 census, Slovenia's main ethnic group are Slovenes (83%). At least 13% of the population were immigrants from other parts of Former Yugoslavia, primarily ethnic Bosniaks (Bosnian Muslims), Croats and Serbs and their descendants. They have settled mainly in cities and suburbanised areas. Relatively small but protected by the Constitution of Slovenia are the Hungarian and the Italian national community. A special position is held by the geographically dispersed Roma ethnic community.

Slovenia is among the European countries with the most pronounced ageing of population, ascribable to a low birth rate and increasing life expectancy. Almost all Slovenian inhabitants older than 64 are retired, with no significant difference between the genders. The working-age group is diminishing in spite of immigration. The proposal to raise the retirement age from the current 57 for women and 58 for men was rejected in a referendum in 2011. Also the difference among the genders regarding life expectancy is still significant. In 2007, it was 74.6 years for men and 81.8 years for women. In addition, in 2009, the suicide rate in Slovenia was 22 per 100,000 persons per year, which places Slovenia among the highest ranked European countries in this regard.

Population

Vital statistics

Source: Statistical Office of the Republic of Slovenia

Current vital statistics

Life expectancy at birth

Marriages and divorces

Immigration

Ethnic groups
The majority of Slovenia's population are ethnic Slovenes (83.06%). Hungarians and Italians have the status of indigenous minorities under the Constitution of Slovenia, which guarantees them seats in the National Assembly. Most other minority groups, particularly those from other parts of the former Yugoslavia (except for one part of autochthonous community of Serbs and Croats), relocated after World War II for economic reasons.

Around 12.4% of the inhabitants of Slovenia were born abroad.
According to data from 2008, there were around 100,000 non-EU citizens living in Slovenia, or around 5% of the overall population of the country. The highest number came from Bosnia and Herzegovina, followed by immigrants from Serbia, North Macedonia, Croatia (which has since joined the EU itself) and Kosovo. In April 2019, there were 143,192 foreign citizens living in Slovenia, representing 6.87% of Slovenia's population. The number of people migrating to Slovenia has been steadily rising from 1995; and the rate of immigration itself has been increasing year-on-year, reaching its peak in 2016. Since Slovenia joined the EU in 2004, the yearly inflow of immigrants has doubled by 2006 and tripled by 2009. In 2007, Slovenia was one of the countries with the fastest growth of net migration rate in the European Union.

Religion

Traditionally, Slovenes are predominantly Roman Catholic. Before World War II, 97% of Slovenes declared as Roman Catholics, around 2.5% were Lutheran, and only around 0.5% belonged to other denominations. Catholicism was an important feature of both social and political life in pre-Communist Slovenia. After 1945, the country underwent a process of gradual but steady secularization. After a decade of severe persecution of religions, the Communist regime adopted a policy of relative tolerance towards the churches, but limited their social functioning. After 1990, the Roman Catholic Church regained some of its former influence, but Slovenia remains a largely secularized society. According to the 2002 census, 57.8% of the population is Roman Catholic.  As elsewhere in Europe, affiliation with Roman Catholicism is dropping:  in 1991, 71.6% were self-declared Catholics, which means a drop of more than 1% annually. The vast majority of Slovenian Catholics belong to the Latin Rite. A small number of Greek Catholics live in the White Carniola region.

Despite a relatively small number of Protestants (less than 1% in 2002), the Protestant legacy is important because of its historical significance, since the bases of Slovene standard language and Slovene literature were established by the Protestant Reformation in the 16th century. Nowadays, a significant Lutheran minority lives in the easternmost region of Prekmurje, where they represent around a fifth of the population and are headed by a bishop with the seat in Murska Sobota.

Besides these two Christian denominations, a small Jewish community has also been historically present. Despite the losses suffered during the Holocaust, Judaism still numbers a few hundred adherents, mostly living in Ljubljana, site of the sole remaining active synagogue in the country.

According to the 2002 census, Islam is the second largest religious denomination with around 2.4% of the population. Most Slovenian Muslims came from Bosnia and Herzegovina, Kosovo, and North Macedonia. The third largest denomination, with around 2.2% of the population, is Orthodox Christianity, with most adherents belonging to the Serbian Orthodox Church while a minority belongs to the Macedonian Orthodox Church and other Orthodox churches.

In the 2002, around 10% of Slovenes declared themselves as atheists, another 10% professed no specific denomination, and around 16% decided not to answer the question about their religious affiliation. According to the Eurobarometer Poll 2005, 37% of Slovenian citizens responded that "they believe there is a god", whereas 46% answered that "they believe there is some sort of spirit or life force" and 16% that "they do not believe there is any sort of spirit, god, or life force".

The distribution of the residents of Slovenia by religion is the following: Roman Catholic 57.8%, atheist 10.1%, Muslim 2.4%, Orthodox Christian 2.3%, Protestant 0.9%, other and unknown 26.5% (2002).

According to the published data from the 2002 Slovenian census, out of a total of 47,488 Muslims (2.4% of the total population) 2,804 Muslims (5.90% of the total Muslims in Slovenia) declared themselves as ethnic Slovenian Muslims.

Language

The official language in Slovenia is Slovene, which is a member of the South Slavic language group. In 2002, Slovene was the native language of around 88% of Slovenia's population according to the census, with more than 92% of the Slovenian population speaking it in their home environment. This places Slovenia among the most homogeneous countries in the EU in terms of the share of speakers of predominant mother tongue. Slovene is sometimes characterized as the most diverse Slavic language in terms of dialects, with different degrees of mutual intelligibility. Accounts of the number of dialects range from as few as seven dialects, often considered dialect groups or dialect bases that are further subdivided into as many as 50 dialects. Other sources characterize the number of dialects as nine or eight.

The distribution of speakers by language is the following: Slovene 87.7%, Serbo-Croatian 8%, Hungarian 0.4%, Albanian 0.4%, Macedonian 0.2%, Romani 0.2%, Italian 0.2%, German 0.1%, other 0.1% (Russian, Czech, Ukrainian, English, Slovak, Polish, Romanian, Turkish, French, Bulgarian, Arabic, Spanish, Dutch, "Vlach", Rusyn, Greek, Swedish, Danish or Armenian), unknown 2.7% (2002)

CIA World Factbook demographic statistics 

The following demographic statistics are from the CIA World Factbook, unless otherwise indicated.

Population
2,102,678 (July 2020 est.)

Age structure
0–14 years:
13.4% (male 138,604/female 130,337)
15–64 years:
69.8% (male 703,374/female 692,640)
65 years and over:
16.8% (male 132,096/female 203,068) (2011 est.)

Median age
total: 42.8 years
male: 41.1 years
female: 44.5 years (2012 est.)

Urbanization
urban population: 50% of total population (2012 est.)
rate of urbanization: 0.2% annual rate of change (2010-2015 est.)

Sex ratio
at birth:
1.07 male(s)/female
under 15 years:
1.06 male(s)/female
15–64 years:
1.01 male(s)/female
65 years and over:
0.66 male(s)/female
total population:
0.95 male(s)/female (2011 est.)

Infant mortality rate
4.12 deaths/1,000 live births (2010)

Life expectancy at birth
total population:
80 years
male:
77 years
female:
83 years (2013 est)

See also
 Gottschee
 Bosniaks of Slovenia
 Croats of Slovenia
 Serbs of Slovenia
 History of the Jews in Slovenia
 Izbrisani
 
 Demographics of the Kingdom of Yugoslavia
 Demographics of the Socialist Federal Republic of Yugoslavia
 Demographics of Austria
 Demographics of Croatia
 Demographics of Hungary
 Demographics of Italy

References

External links
 Demography and Social Statistics of Slovenia, SURS
 Results of the 2002 census, SURS

 
Society of Slovenia
Demographics of Yugoslavia